British girl group Honeyz released one studio album, eight singles and one compilation album. The group, formed in 1998 by Celena Cherry, Heavenli Abdi and Naima Belkhiati, had five UK top 10 hits between 1998 and 2000, with "Finally Found" (1998), "End of the Line" (1998), "Love of a Lifetime" (1999), "Never Let You Down" (2000) and  "Won't Take It Lying Down" (2000).

Albums

Studio albums

Compilation albums

Singles

As lead artist

As featured artist

Promotional singles

References

Discographies of British artists
Rhythm and blues discographies